Deepak Foundation is a non-profit organization based in Vadodara, Gujarat. It was founded by Shri C.K. Mehta of Deepak Group of Industries in 1982 with the aim of providing maternal and child care services to industrial workers living in GIDC(Gujarat Industrial Development Corporation) area, and area with a rural population of nearly 50,000 around its plant in Nandesari, Vadodara in Gujarat. Deepak Foundation provides development aid in rural and tribal areas of The district Vadodara. The foundation's mission is to create and enable a sustainable environment among rural and tribal communities by setting up a basis of livelihood and an intact healthcare system.
Nearly 400 full-time professional staff are sanctioned at 22 different locations throughout Vadodara district. Women compromise 35% of the total staff, their work helps almost 2 Million beneficiaries.

Vision 

To approach to that vision, Deepak Foundation set the follow goals to itself:

 Promote practices for safe motherhood and child survival.
 Offer an access to health and pre-school education services.
 Ensure sustainable livelihood for underprivileged communities.
 Provide disaster relief and rehabilitation services.

History 

Caused by the people suffering from floods in Amreli District of Gujarat State in the year 1981, Shri C.K. Mehta decided to become socially active. He is the founder and today the chairman of the Deepak Foundation. The first initiative was a small 15-bed maternal and child care hospital to provide curative and preventive services for the industrial workers living around 30 villages surrounding the industrial belt of
Nadesari, Vadodara.  The population of this area was 40,000. An Emergency Transport Facility was established in 1982. This service assisted government in delivering maternal and child care services in these 30 villages.

The foundation gradually made a foray into sectors like livelihood promoting by setting up first women's dairy cooperative societies and women's self-help groups, disaster relief and rehabilitation, preschool education, HIV prevention and adolescent health.

In the early nineties the foundation started to promote socio-economic development of the communities through Women's Savings, Credit groups and the first Women's Diary Cooperative in 1995.
Due to heavy influx of migrant workers in industrial belts, the foundation initiated HIV/AIDS prevention interventions in 1997.
Since 2004-2005 the Deepak Foundation is in partnership with the Department of Health and Family Welfare, Government of Gujarat provides motherhood and child survival in the entire tribal area of Vadodara district.
Today, the Organization has evolved into a full-fledged foundation covering all 1548 villages of Vadodara district in Gujarat. The interventions that initially catered to the needs of only the industrial workers for nearly twenty years today through its multifaced programs reaches out to nearly 2 million population spread over 1548 villages of Vadodara district to provide services in various development sectors through Public Private Partnership (PPP).

 Projects 

The Deepak Foundation operates several projects. The main-focus is on SMCS and KALP-Project.

 Safe Motherhood & Child Survival (SMCS) 

The SMCS-Project has been implemented since 2005 in cooperation with the government of Gujarat. The project aims to reduce the infant and maternal mortality in the district by the existing government health delivery systems. The key components of the project are:

 Formation and strengthening of Village Health and Sanitation Committees.
 Behavior Change Communications through village volunteers i.e. Accredited Social Health Activists (ASHAs).
 Setting up emergency transport network and two Mobile Health Units in difficult tribal areas.
 Establishment of Comprehensive Emergency Obstetric and Newborn Care (CEmONC) unit linked to a Community Health Centre covering 9 lakh tribal population.
 Setting up Help Desk at district level receiving referral cases from peripheral areas.
 Providing a comprehensive package of services for anemia prevention and control.

 Kawant Livelihood Project (KALP) 

Started in 2009, the KALP-Project contains multiple steps to develop livelihood in Kawant. Kawant comprises more than 30,000 households. Holistic development through people's participation calls for integration of services at grass roots level. KALP is an initiative in this direction. The project has been implemented in partnership with the Tribal Development Department, Government of Gujarat. The foundation plans to undertake the following:

 Promote livelihood opportunities in conventional and potential farm and non-farm sectors.
 Generate additional employment through skills development, extension and credit support and micro entrepreneurship promotion.
 Mitigate distress migration by the creation of a strong social safety net for the vulnerable groups and create fall back employment sources.
 Promote community participation in the process of development and establish Kawant Development Corporation under section 25 of the Companies Act.

 Further More Projects 

Other projects are for example Deepak Medical Foundation Hospital (DMF), Pre-School Education & Care, Integrated Child Development Services, Sexual Health and HIV/AIDS awareness or Disaster Relief and Rehabilitation''.

References

External links 
 official website Retrieved 2 February 2011
 Healthmarket Innovations.com Retrieved 4 February 2011

Charities based in India
Foundations based in India
Development charities based in India
Organisations based in Gujarat
Non-profit organisations based in India
Social welfare charities
1982 establishments in Gujarat